Ekee Britte is a 2013 Bangladeshi film starring Naznin Hasan Chumki and Tauquir Ahmed as lead stars. Chumki earned Meril Prothom Alo Awards for Best Actress (critics) by beating veteran actress Moushumi and Shochcho earned Bangladesh National Film Awards for Best Child Artist.

Story
Chumki plays a maid, who works in a professed landlord's house. The film portrays her struggle in life.

Soundtrack

Awards 
38th Bangladesh National Film Awards
 Winner: Best Child Actor - Shochcho
Meril Prothom Alo Awards 
 Winner: Best Actress (critics) - Naznin Hasan Chumki

References

External links 
 

2013 films
Films scored by Sheikh Sadi Khan
Bengali-language Bangladeshi films
2010s Bengali-language films
Impress Telefilm films